Julio Antonio Miranda (17 October 1946 – 6 June 2021) was an Argentine politician and a member of the Justicialist Party. He was a Senator for Tucumán Province and was part of the majority Front for Victory parliamentary group. Previously he had been governor of Tucumán and national Senator before being elected to this office

Born in the village of Manuel García Fernández, in Leales Department, Tucumán, Miranda completed the 4th grade (half) of elementary school. Miranda's political career began as trade union man, representing the State Oil Workers Trade Union (SUPE). He was elected a Senator in 1992 by the Tucuman province legislature. In 1999, Miranda was elected Governor of Tucumán by a narrow margin (6,800 votes) defeating the son of the incumbent governor Antonio Domingo Bussi. His four years saw considerable controversy and fierce opposition from the Republican Force Tucumán party led by Antonio Bussi and his son, Ricardo. At the end of his term in 2003, Miranda stood again for the Senate. His party's candidate, José Alperovich, beat the younger Bussi for the governorship.

From 1997 to 1999, Miranda was President of the soccer club Club Atlético Tucumán.

He died on 6 June 2021 at the age of 74.

References

External links
Senate profile

1946 births
2021 deaths
People from Tucumán Province
Argentine people of Spanish descent
Members of the Argentine Senate for Tucumán
Governors of Tucumán Province
Justicialist Party politicians